Shanta Chaudhary is a social reformer and Former Member of Constituent Assembly of Nepal (CA). Chaudhary was an illiterate forced child labourer as part of the, now abandoned, Kamalari system.

Biography 
Chaudhary was forced to become a Kamlari when she was eight. She was leased for Rs 7,000 a year by her parents who had nine other children. She was sent to work for a family in Dang. During this time, she was forced to work for 19 hours a day, and she lived in the cowshed. She was reprimanded for her mistakes and sometimes beaten by the landlord's wife. Chaudhary remained as a servants until she was eighteen, during which time she became active in politics. She represented Dang in a forum for the lands rights movement.

In 2008, Chaudhary was chosen to lead the Parliamentary Committee on Natural Resources and Means. Her illiteracy was a problem in the CA and she started taking classes. Eventually, in 2013, she published a book, Kamlari Dekhi Sabhasad Samma, about her experiences.

In 2016, she was diagnosed with uterine cancer and is currently receiving treatment.

References

Living people
21st-century Nepalese women politicians
21st-century Nepalese politicians
21st-century Nepalese writers
21st-century Nepalese women writers
Nepal MPs 2017–2022
Nepal Communist Party (NCP) politicians
Members of the 1st Nepalese Constituent Assembly
Communist Party of Nepal (Unified Marxist–Leninist) politicians
1979 births